Allah Chal (also Romanized as Āllah Chāl; also known as Aleh Chāl) is a village in Lalehabad Rural District, Lalehabad District, Babol County, Mazandaran Province, Iran. At the 2006 census, its population was 979, in 264 families.

References 

Populated places in Babol County